Dapagliflozin/saxagliptin, sold under the brand name Qtern, is a fixed-dose combination anti-diabetic medication used as an adjunct to diet and exercise to improve glycemic control in adults with type 2 diabetes. It is a combination of dapagliflozin and saxagliptin. It is taken by mouth.

The most common side effects include upper respiratory tract infection (such as nose and throat infections) and, when used with a sulphonylurea, hypoglycaemia (low blood glucose levels).

Dapagliflozin/saxagliptin was approved for medical use in the European Union in July 2016, and in the United States in February 2017.

Medical uses 
In the United States dapagliflozin/saxagliptin is indicated as an adjunct to diet and exercise to improve glycemic control in adults with type 2 diabetes.

In the European Union it is indicated in adults aged 18 years and older with type 2 diabetes mellitus:
 to improve glycemic control when metformin with or without sulphonylurea (SU) and either saxagliptin or dapagliflozin does not provide adequate glycemic control. 
 when already being treated with saxagliptin and dapagliflozin.

References

External links
 
 
 
 

Adamantanes
Anti-diabetic drugs
AstraZeneca brands
Carboxamides
Chloroarenes
Combination drugs
Dipeptidyl peptidase-4 inhibitors
Glucosides
Nitriles
Nitrogen heterocycles
Phenol ethers
SGLT2 inhibitors
Tertiary alcohols